Bryan Small (born 15 November 1971) is an English former professional footballer who played as a defender.

He started out as a trainee at his hometown club Aston Villa and played for a total of 11 clubs in a series of free transfers and loan deals. Small played for Birmingham City, Bolton Wanderers, Luton Town, Bradford City, Bury, Stoke City and Walsall. At international level he was capped 12 times for the England under-21 team.

Playing career
Small was born in Birmingham and began his career as a trainee at Aston Villa making his debut away at Everton in 1991–92. He played in 13 matches that season and made 15 appearances in 1992–93.

In 1993–94 Small played 12 times for Villa including two against Deportivo de La Coruña in the UEFA Cup. In the 1994–95 season he played five matches for Villa and had a loan spell at second city rivals Birmingham City where he played three times.

He left Villa in Match 1996 for Bolton Wanderers where he made 16 appearances helping the club win the First Division in 1996–97. Small was unable to force his way into the team in the Premier League and spent time out on loan at Luton Town, Bradford City and Bury. At Bury he scored his only goal of his career against Sunderland.

In the summer 1998 Small moved to Stoke City where he made 43 appearances in 1998–99 as Stoke failed to claim a play-off place. In 1999–2000 he nine appearances before being released in the summer of 2000. Following his release from Stoke Small had unsuccessful trials at Carlisle United and Brentford.

Another free transfer followed to Walsall but he failed to make the first team. After a loan spell at Forest Green Rovers he moved to Kettering Town before he finished his career at Hednesford Town.

Later career
Small began his coaching career with Stourport Swifts and in July 2008 turned out for old club Bolton in the Masters Tournament.

Personal life
Small's nephew, Thierry Small, became Everton's youngest first-team debutant when he made a brief appearance in the FA Cup as a 16-year-old in early 2021, and turned professional later that year with Southampton.

Career statistics

Honours
Bolton Wanderers
 Football League First Division: 1996–97

References

External links
 

1971 births
Living people
Footballers from Birmingham, West Midlands
English footballers
England under-21 international footballers
Association football defenders
Aston Villa F.C. players
Birmingham City F.C. players
Bolton Wanderers F.C. players
Luton Town F.C. players
Bradford City A.F.C. players
Bury F.C. players
Stoke City F.C. players
Walsall F.C. players
Forest Green Rovers F.C. players
Kettering Town F.C. players
Hednesford Town F.C. players
Premier League players
English Football League players
National League (English football) players
Black British sportsmen
Association football coaches